Randolph B. Schultz (November 17, 1943 – October 4, 1996) was an American football player in the National Football League (NFL).

Drafted in the fifth round of the 1966 NFL draft by the Cleveland Browns, Randy Schultz played the 1966 season with the Browns, followed by two seasons with the NFL's New Orleans Saints. He was also drafted in the 20th round of the 1966 AFL draft (177th overall) by the New York Jets.

As a collegian, Schultz was twice named to the first team of the Associated Press Little All America squad (1964–65). At State College of Iowa (SCI) – now the University of Northern Iowa – he rushed for 2,808 yards and 22 touchdowns in three seasons, averaging more than 100 yards rushing per game.  He led the North Central Conference (NCC) in rushing for the 1963, '64 and '65 seasons. He was named the NCC Most Valuable Back for the 1964 and '65 seasons and an NCC All-Conference selection at fullback for the 1963, '64 and '65 seasons.

In his final college game, he set school records for rushing yards in a game (120) and rushing touchdowns in a game (4) against South Dakota University and finished his college career holding all Panther rushing records.

In 1987, he was inducted into the University of Northern Iowa Athletics Hall of Fame and again in 2010 as a member of the 1964 SCI football team, which won the 1964 Pecan Bowl.

Schultz died October 4, 1996.

References

External links 
 Randy Schultz at Pro Football Encyclopedia
 Randy Schultz at Pro Football Archives
 Video Highlights of Schultz's 1963 season
 

1943 births
1996 deaths
American football running backs
Northern Iowa Panthers football players
Cleveland Browns players
New Orleans Saints players
Players of American football from Iowa
People from Iowa Falls, Iowa